The Lent Bumps 2011 was a series of rowing races being held at Cambridge University from Tuesday 1 March 2011 until Saturday 5 March 2011. The event was run as a bumps race and is the 124th set of races in the series of Lent Bumps which have been held annually in late-February or early March in this form since 1887. See Lent Bumps for the format of the races. In 2011, 121 crews took part (69 men's crews and 52 women's crews), with nearly 1100 participants in total.

Head of the River crews

  women bumped  on the first day gaining the headship they last held during Lent Bumps 2005.

Highest 2nd VIIIs

  finished as the highest placed men's second VIII, moving up 3 places overall and bumping  on the last day.

Links to races in other years

Bumps Charts

Below are the bumps charts all 4 men's and all 3 women's divisions, with the men's event on the left and women's event on the right. The bumps chart represents the progress of every crew over all four days of the racing. To follow the progress of any particular crew, simply find the crew's name on the left side of the chart and follow the line to the end-of-the-week finishing position on the right of the chart. The combined Hughes Hall/Lucy Cavendish women's crews are listed as Lucy Cavendish only.

Note that this chart may not be displayed correctly if you are using a large font size on your browser. A simple way to check is to see that the first horizontal bold line, marking the boundary between divisions, lies between positions 17 and 18.

The Getting-on Race

The Getting-on Race allows a number of crews which did not already have a place from last year's races to compete for the right to race this year. Up to ten crews are removed from the bottom of last year's finishing order, who must then race alongside new entrants to decide which crews gain a place (with one bumps place per 3 crews competing, subject to the maximum of 10 available places).

The 2011 Lent Bumps Getting-on Race took place on 25 February 2011.

Competing crews

Men

20 men's crews raced for 7 available spaces at the bottom of the 4th division.  The following were successful and rowed in the bumps.

The following were unsuccessful.

Women

20 women's crews raced for 7 available spaces at the bottom of the 3rd division.  The following were successful and rowed in the bumps.

/*

The following were unsuccessful.

Lent Bumps results
Lent Bumps
Lent Bumps
Lent Bumps